Carl Wilhelm (born 1872 in Vienna; died in London 1936), was a prolific German film director, film producer and screenwriter of the silent film era, at the end of which his career apparently entirely faded away and he vanished into obscurity.

Life 
After his first work, the short documentary film Ein vergnügter Wintertag im Berliner Grunewald, made for the producer Oskar Messter in 1909, Wilhelm worked for many other Berlin production companies. For example, in the years before World War I, he filmed for Deutsche Mutoskop- und Biograph GmbH in Lankwitz and BB-Film-Fabrikation Bolten-Baeckers in Steglitz a series of comedies starring the silent film star Leo Peukert.

The two comedies he shot in 1913 and 1914 with Ernst Lubitsch - Die Firma heiratet and Der Stolz der Firma - were very successful. As late as 1919 a critic could write: "Die Firma heiratet and Meyer aus Berlin are still our best films."

In 1915, with his company Cewe-Films, and in 1920/21, with Carl-Wilhelm-Film GmbH, he also operated as his own producer. In 1917 and 1918 he made a number of films in Hungarian. Carl Wilhelm remained a sought-after director until the end of the silent film period. He then ceased to work almost entirely - he is last heard of as a production assistant in 1935. He left Germany for Vienna after the coming to power of the Nazi party in 1933 and, already ill, joined his son Wolfgang in London where he died in 1936.

Filmography

As director 

 1909: Ein vergnügter Wintertag im Berliner Grunewald - also actor
 1911: Leibeigenschaft (with Leo Peukert)
 1912: Der abgeführte Liebhaber
 1912: Brüderchens Heldentat
 1912: Das elfte Gebot: Du sollst nicht stören Deines Nächsten Flitterwochen
 1912: Die Hand des Schicksals (with Leopoldine Konstantin) – co-director with Heinrich Bolten-Baeckers
 1912: Leo, der Witwenfreund / Leo als Witwenfreund (with Leo Peukert)
 1912: Mama: Roman aus dem Leben einer Schauspielerin
 1912: Die Nachbarskinder – co-director with Heinrich Bolten-Baeckers
 1912/13: Leo, der schwarze Münchhausen (with Leo Peukert)
 1913: Die Kunstschützin (with Leo Peukert) – also actor; co-director with Heinrich Bolten-Baeckers
 1913: Der Shylock von Krakau (with Rudolph Schildkraut); screenplay: Felix Salten) – also actor)
 1913: Tangofieber
 The Firm Gets Married (1914) (with Ernst Lubitsch, Ressel Orla)
 1914: Fräulein Leutnant / Fräulein Feldgrau (also screenplay together with Walter Turszinsky)
 1914: Die Marketenderin (with Else Eckersberg; also screenplay together with Arno Arndt)
 1914: Der Stolz der Firma. Die Geschichte eines Lehrlings (with Ernst Lubitsch)
 1915: Der Barbier von Flimersdorf (with Oscar Sabo) – also screenplay
 1915: Berlin im Kriegsjahr (documentary film produced by Erich Pommer on commission from the Verein der Zentralstelle für den Fremdenverkehr)
 1915: Carl und Carla (with Lisa Weise)
 1915: Frau Annas Pilgerfahrt.
 1916: Sami, der Seefahrer
 1916: Ein Zirkusmädel
 1917: Albert läßt sich scheiden
 1917: Doktor Lauffen
 1917: Az elátkozott család
 1917: Fabricius úr leánya
 1917: Fekete gyémántok
 1918: A Gazdag szegények
 1918: A Szerelem bolondjai
 1919: Die Himmelskönigin / Du meine Himmelskönigin (with Margarete Schön, Gustav Adolf Semler) – also screenplay
 The Duty to Live (1919)
 1919: Prinzessin Tatjana oder Wenn ein Weib den Weg verliert
 The Yellow Death (1920, Part I) (with Gustav Adolf Semler, Rosa Valetti)
 The Yellow Death (1920, Part II) (with Ernst Deutsch, Margarete Schön, Gustav Adolf Semler)
 Respectable Women (1920)
 The Eyes of the World (1920) (with Conrad Veidt) – also screenplay together with Ruth Goetz, and production
 1920: Das Götzenbild der Wahrheit
 1920: Der langsame Tod / Die nach Liebe schmachten (with Lucie Höflich, Eduard von Winterstein) – also screenplay together with Ruth Goetz, production
 The Clan (1920)  - also screenplay together with Ruth Goetz, production
 1921: The House of Torment  – also screenplay and production
 1921: Das gestohlene Millionenrezept – also production
 Country Roads and the Big City (1921) / Musikanten des Lebens (with Carola Toelle, Fritz Kortner, Conrad Veidt) – also production
 1921: Der Liebling der Frauen – also production
 1921: Perlen bedeuten Tränen / Tragische Abenteuer des Japaners Dr. Rao (with Albert Steinrück, Aud Egede-Nissen)
 1921: Unrecht Gut
 1921/22: Menschenopfer (with Hans Albers)
 Lumpaci the Vagabond (1922) (with Hans Albers) – also screenplay
 Debit and Credit (1924) (with Theodor Loos, Olga Tschechowa) - also screenplay, together with Karl Figdor based on the novel by Gustav Freytag
 Nick, King of the Chauffeurs (1925)
 Upstairs and Downstairs (1925)
 The Alternative Bride (1925) (with Ida Wüst)
 The Third Squadron (1926) (with Claire Rommer, Ralph Arthur Roberts, Camilla Spira) – also screenplay together with Bobby E. Lüthge
 1926: Mikoschs letztes Abenteuer – also screenplay
 When the Young Wine Blossoms (1927) – also screenplay, together with Max Jungk based on a story by Bjørnstjerne Bjørnson
 It Attracted Three Fellows (1928) (with Hans Albers, Hertha von Walther)
 The Duty to Remain Silent (1928) (with Gustav Fröhlich, Kurt Gerron) – also screenplay
 1928: Kaczmarek
 The Gypsy Chief (1929) – also screenplay
 Dear Homeland (1929) (with Renate Müller, Hans Brausewetter, Hans Albers, Lotte Werkmeister) - produced by Erich Engels
 Rooms to Let (1930) (with Henry Bender, Ida Wüst, Albert Paulig) – also screenplay, together with Bobby E. Lüthge
 The Firm Gets Married (1931) (with Ralph Arthur Roberts, Charlotte Ander, Oskar Karlweis, Ida Wüst, Theo Lingen, Julius Falkenstein, Trude Westerberg)

Other 
 1910: Hexenlied (with Henny Porten; directed by Franz Porten) – actor
 1910: Die Vernunft des Herzens (directed by Charles Decroix) – actor
 1910: Pro patria. Ein Unterseebootsfilm (with Leo Peukert; directed by Charles Decroix) – director's assistant
 1910/11: Vater und Sohn (directed by Walter Schmidthässler) – actor
 1911: Das Herz einer Gattin (directed by Charles Decroix) – actor
 1913/14: Eine venezianische Nacht (directed by Max Reinhardt) – director's assistant
 1932: Spell of the Looking Glass (directed by Frank Wisbar) – "collective direction", together with Herbert Ephraim
 1935: J'aime toutes les femmes (directed by Carl Lamač) – production assistant

References

Notes

Sources
 Fritz, Walter, 1996. Im Kino erlebe ich die Welt – 100 Jahre Kino und Film in Österreich. Verlag Christian Brandstätter: Vienna.

External links 
 
  Short article about the "Deutsche Mutoskop- und Biograph GmbH" ("Muto") incl photo of Carl Wilhelm
  Deutsches Filminstitut: photo of Carl Wilhelm

1872 births
1936 deaths
Film people from Vienna
German male silent film actors
20th-century German male actors
Jewish emigrants from Nazi Germany to the United Kingdom